NGC 2798 is a barred spiral galaxy in the constellation Lynx. NGC 2798 and NGC 2799 are listed under the Arp Catalogue as Arp 283 and noted as an "interacting galaxy pair". The galaxy is listed in the New General Catalogue.

References

External links
 

Barred spiral galaxies
Lynx (constellation)
2798
Interacting galaxies
026232